Koške Poljane is a small dispersed settlement in the  Municipality of Šmartno pri Litiji in central Slovenia. It lies in the Sava Hills west of Šmartno in the historical region of Lower Carniola. The municipality is included in the Central Slovenia Statistical Region.

References

External links
Koške Poljane at Geopedia

Populated places in the Municipality of Šmartno pri Litiji